Bridge L-158 is a disused railroad bridge over Muscoot Reservoir near Goldens Bridge, New York, United States. Built to carry New York Central Railroad traffic over Rondout Creek near Kingston, it was moved to its current location in 1904.

In 1960, it was taken out of service and the tracks removed. It is the only remaining double-intersection Whipple truss railroad bridge in New York. In 1978, it was listed on the National Register of Historic Places, the only bridge entirely within Westchester County to be listed in its own right.

Location

The bridge is located over an inlet in the reservoir approximately one half-mile (1 km) west of the Goldens Bridge station on the Metro-North Harlem Line and Interstate 684. It straddles the line between the town of Lewisboro on the east and Somers on the west.

NY 138 crosses the reservoir  to the north. It is most clearly seen from here, although it can also be seen through the woods from commuter trains near the station.

It is surrounded by woodlands, part of the reservoir's protected watershed lands, all owned, like the bridge, by the New York City Department of Environmental Protection. The former route of the tracks is visible on both approaches to the bridge.

Structure

Its pin-connected superstructure uses wrought iron Phoenix columns in its top chord and compression members. The end posts and upper chord are made up of six flanged cast elements riveted together. The intermediate verticals and lateral struts have four apiece.

Round bars are used for the counters and sway braces. The ties are on iron stringers riveted to transverse iron floor beams. Both portals are decorated with quatrefoil brackets and finials.

History

The bridge was originally the smallest of three spans in a  viaduct-bridge combination along the former West Shore Line at the mouth of Rondout Creek in Kingston,  to the north. It was built in 1883 by Clarke, Reeves & Company, a Philadelphia-based subsidiary of the Phoenix Iron Works  as a  double-tracked structure, known administratively within the Central as Bridge 141.

In 1904, the railroad built another bridge at the Rondout that could carry the entire load on one span. At the same time, New York City was beginning to buy, clear and flood land for its water supply system in the Croton River watershed. Railroads in the area were required, under their agreements with the city, to install bridges over any inundated areas at their own expense.

The railroad decided to move Bridge 141, now Bridge L-158, south to the new reservoir where it would easily bridge the gap needed for the Mahopac Branch from the former New York and Harlem Railroad main line. The branch, formerly the New York & Mahopac Railroad, served what had been a summer resort community in the 19th century.

Service on the Mahopac Branch continued until 1960. The tracks were eventually dismantled to and from the bridge, but the bridge itself remained. In 1976, a survey team from the Historic American Engineering Record found that it remained in good condition despite the lack of maintenance or use. Its presence on New York City watershed land, where public access is tightly restricted, has helped preserve it as well.

See also

List of bridges documented by the Historic American Engineering Record in New York (state)
List of bridges on the National Register of Historic Places in New York
National Register of Historic Places listings in northern Westchester County, New York

References

External links

Pictures of Bridge L-158 and the Muscoot Reservoir

L158
L158
L158
L158
Historic American Engineering Record in New York (state)
L158
L158
National Register of Historic Places in Westchester County, New York
Transportation buildings and structures in Westchester County, New York
Somers, New York
1883 establishments in New York (state)